Kultrum is a solo album by  Argentine musician Dino Saluzzi recorded in 1982 and released on the ECM label.

Reception
The Allmusic review awarded by Michael G. Nastos the album 3½ stars stating "Dino Saluzzi as a solo performer is one of the more remarkable musicians in contemporary music, in that he plays several instruments, including his beloved bandoneon with such precision, balance and subtle power. Kultrum is indeed a multi-cultural project that taps into the folkloric, ancestral, and traditional sounds of Native American Indians and his South American roots, enhanced by producer Manfred Eicher's Eurocentric notions. The blending of deep drums, rattling percussion, and chanted vocals with the bandoneon or wood flutes creates a vista of deeply spiritual and ancient ritualistic music. Somehow these sounds are magically transmuted and modernized by the pristine sonic tones the ECM production team always lends to their albums, making this a true contemporary world music tour de force.

Track listing
All compositions by Dino Saluzzi
 "Kultrum Pampa" - 9:26   
 "Gabriel Kondor" - 5:15   
 "Agua de Paz" - 8:28   
 "Pajaros y Ceibos" - 3:11   
 "Ritmo Arauca" - 6:43   
 "El Rio y El Abuelo" - 7:02   
 "Pasos Que Quedan" - 4:14   
 "Por el Sol y Por la Lluvia" - 6:50
Recorded at Tonstudio Bauer in Ludwigsburg, West Germany in November 1982

Personnel
Dino Saluzzi — bandoneón, voice, percussion, flutes

References

ECM Records albums
Dino Saluzzi albums
1983 albums
Albums produced by Manfred Eicher